Elia Galera (born March 19, 1973) is a Spanish actress and television presenter.

She has worked with famous directors such as Agustín Díaz Yanes and Carlos Saura, sharing the stage with Alberto San Juan, Robert Alvarez, Victoria Abril, Penélope Cruz, John Echanove, Juan Diego, Alex Angulo, Adriana Ozores, Unax Ugalde, José Coronado and Goya Toledo.

Television credits include her work on series including The past is tomorrow and Central Hospital, both on Telecinco.

As a television presenter, also on Telecinco, she became popular as co-anchor of the Popstars contest, alongside Jesús Vázquez in 2002.

Filmography

Films
 La mujer más fea del mundo (1999), by Miguel Bardem.
 Sin noticias de Dios (2001), by Agustín Díaz Yanes.
 El séptimo día (2004), by Carlos Saura.
 Héctor (2004), by Gracia Querejeta.
 Isi/Disi. Amor a lo bestia (2004), by Chema de la Peña.
 Fuera del cuerpo (2004), by Vicente Peñarrocha.

Television  
 La corriente alterna
 Capital (2004)
 El pasado es mañana (2005)
 Hospital central, as Claudia Castilla (2006-2011)
 La Baronesa, Como Paula (2011)
 Frágiles, as Teresa González  (Telecinco, 2012-2013)
 El Príncipe, as Raquel (Telecinco, 2014–present)
 El Cid, as Queen Sancha (Amazon Prime, 2018-2020)

T.V. presenter 
 100% cine (2000)
 Popstars (2002)

External links 
 Official Website
 Elia Galera in 'Just For You'
 

1973 births
Actresses from Madrid
Spanish film actresses
Spanish television actresses
Living people
20th-century Spanish actresses
21st-century Spanish actresses